Herb Johnson (born Herb Johnson Wilkerson) is a former professional basketball player with Villars Basket in Switzerland.  Johnson played collegiately with the University of Tulsa.

College career
At Tulsa, Johnson helped the team to the 1981 NIT title and appearances in the 1982, 1983, and 1984 NCAA Tournaments.  As of 2010, Johnson is in the top 5 of Golden Hurricane career leaders in rebounds, top 10 in steals, and top 15 in scoring.

Professional career
Johnson was a third-round pick of the Cleveland Cavaliers in the 1985 NBA Draft.
His professional career has included stops in France, Spain, Japan, Turkey and most recently Switzerland.  Johnson played the 2004–05 season with Union Neuchâtel Basket, 2005 to 2007 with Pages Jaunes Pully Basket, and the 2008–09 season with Vevey Riviera Basket.  He joined Villars Basket for the 2009 season.

Personal life
Johnson's daughter Brandie Wilkerson is a professional beach volleyball player for Canada. Wilkerson was born in Switzerland and moved to Canada along with Johnson when she was seven. His wife, Wilkerson's mother, Stephanie, was a Swiss national runner and a two-time Ironman finalist.

References

1962 births
Living people
American expatriate basketball people in France
American expatriate basketball people in Japan
American expatriate basketball people in Spain
American expatriate basketball people in Switzerland
American expatriate basketball people in Turkey
Basketball players from Texas
Cleveland Cavaliers draft picks
La Crosse Catbirds players
Maine Windjammers players
Tulsa Golden Hurricane men's basketball players
Vevey Riviera Basket players
American men's basketball players
American emigrants to Canada
Centers (basketball)
Power forwards (basketball)